The 2017 Papua New Guinea earthquake was an  7.9 earthquake that struck at 04:30 UTC on 22 January 2017.

Impact

Damage
Damage occurred in Arawa and parts of central Bougainville, while a power outage occurred in Buka.

Casualties
Two children were killed and another was injured from a landslide, and a 7-year old girl died after she was hit by falling rocks. Another landslide killed two teenagers as well. Fifteen children were injured by falling trees and rocks, while two men were slightly injured by a landslide in Panguna.

See also 
 List of earthquakes in 2017
 List of earthquakes in Papua New Guinea
 2016 Solomon Islands earthquakes

References 

2017 earthquakes
2017 in Papua New Guinea
2017 in the Solomon Islands
Earthquakes in Papua New Guinea
Earthquakes in the Solomon Islands
January 2017 events in Oceania
2017 disasters in Papua New Guinea